Taduesz Kwapień (February 25, 1923 – November 23, 2012) was a former Polish cross-country skier who competed in the 1940s and the 1950s.

He was born in Kościelisko and died in Zakopane.

Participated in three Olympic games. He was 47th in the 18 km event, 25th in the Nordic combined and 10th in the 4 x 10 km cross-country relay at the 1948 Winter Olympics in Sankt Moritz. He finished 41st in the 18 km event at the 1952 Winter Olympics in Oslo. In his last Olympic appearance at the 1956 Winter Olympics in Cortina d'Ampezzo Kwapień finished 16th in the 15 km event, 12th in the 30 km event and 9th in the 4 x 10 km relay.

External links
18 km Olympic cross country results: 1948-52

1923 births
2012 deaths
Polish male cross-country skiers
Polish male Nordic combined skiers
Olympic cross-country skiers of Poland
Olympic Nordic combined skiers of Poland
Cross-country skiers at the 1948 Winter Olympics
Cross-country skiers at the 1952 Winter Olympics
Cross-country skiers at the 1956 Winter Olympics
Nordic combined skiers at the 1948 Winter Olympics
People from Tatra County
Sportspeople from Lesser Poland Voivodeship
20th-century Polish people